Charles Collingwood may refer to:
 Charles Collingwood (actor) (born 1943), British actor, best known for his work in the BBC Radio 4 soap opera The Archers
 Charles Collingwood (journalist) (1917–1985), American newscaster for CBS